The 1903 Atlantic hurricane season featured seven hurricanes, the most in a season since 1893. The first tropical cyclone was initially observed in the western Atlantic Ocean near Puerto Rico on July 21. The tenth and final system transitioned into an extratropical cyclone well northwest of the Azores on November 25. These dates fall within the period with the most tropical cyclone activity in the Atlantic. Six of the ten tropical cyclones existed simultaneously.

Of the season's ten tropical storms, seven of those strengthened into a hurricane. One of the seven hurricanes deepened further into a major hurricane, which are tropical cyclones that reach at least Category 3 on the modern day Saffir–Simpson hurricane wind scale. The second, third, and fourth systems left the most significant impacts during this season. The second storm, which struck Jamaica in August, devastated Martinique, Jamaica, and the Cayman Islands. At least 149 deaths were attributed to this storm, while it also caused $10 million (1903 USD) in damage in Jamaica alone. The third cyclone made landfall in Florida twice in mid-August, leaving 14 fatalities and about $500,000 in damage. Only a few days later, the fourth cyclone struck New Jersey. The storm impacted many areas in the Mid-Atlantic region of the United States and caused 57 deaths and about $8 million in damage. Additionally, the remnants of the eighth tropical cyclone caused severe flooding in the Mid-Atlantic.

The Atlantic hurricane reanalysis project also indicated but could not confirm the presence of four additional tropical depressions throughout the season. However, the reanalysis added a previously undetected tropical storm in late October to the Atlantic hurricane database (HURDAT). Reanalysis also resulted in the eighth cyclone being downgraded from a hurricane to a tropical storm.

Season summary 

Tropical cyclogenesis began with the development of the first system on July 21 in the western Atlantic near Puerto Rico. This was the only storm in the month of July. Likewise, August also featured one storm. This was also the first major hurricane in the Atlantic basin since the second storm of 1900 and the first in the Caribbean since the 1899 San Ciriaco hurricane. September was the most active month of the season, with four systems developing, three of which intensified into a hurricane. In October, there were three tropical storms, with one intensifying into a hurricane. The only November tropical cyclone, as well as the final system of the season, developed on November 17 and transitioned into an extratropical cyclone while northwest of the Azores on November 25.

The season had a total of 10 tropical storms, 7 of which intensified into a hurricane. This marked the most hurricanes in a season since the total of eight in 1893. There may have been an additional four tropical depressions throughout the season, but the data obtained by the Atlantic hurricane reanalysis project was inconclusive. The reanalysis added a previously undetected tropical storm in late October to the Atlantic hurricane database (HURDAT). Reanalysis also resulted in the eighth cyclone being downgraded from a Category 2 hurricane to a tropical storm. Nearly all of the season's 10 tropical cyclones impacted land. Collectively, the storms caused over $18.5 million in damage and at least 222 fatalities.

The season's activity was reflected with an accumulated cyclone energy (ACE) rating of 102. ACE is a metric used to express the energy used by a tropical cyclone during its lifetime. Therefore, a storm with a longer duration will have high values of ACE. It is only calculated at six-hour increments in which specific tropical and subtropical systems are either at or above sustained wind speeds of 39 mph (63 km/h), which is the threshold for tropical storm intensity. Thus, tropical depressions are not included here.

Systems

Hurricane One 

The storm moved northwestward until about 12:00 UTC on July 22, at which time it curved northward, before turning northeastward about 24 hours later. Early on July 24, it intensified into a Category 1 hurricane. The hurricane strengthened slightly further, peaking with maximum sustained winds of  six hours later. The system began weakening early on July 24, falling to tropical storm intensity around 12:00 UTC. The extratropical remnants continued east-northeastward and dissipated late on July 26.

Hurricane Two 

The Jamaica Hurricane of 1903 

The system moved generally west-northwestward and strengthened into a hurricane about 24 hours later. Early on August 9, it struck Martinique as either a strong Category 1 or a weak Category 2 hurricane. The storm entered the Caribbean shortly thereafter. Around 12:00 UTC, the cyclone intensified into a Category 3 hurricane. By 12:00 UTC, the storm further weakened to a Category 1. After crossing the Yucatán Peninsula and emerging into the Gulf of Mexico early on August 14, the hurricane failed to re-strengthen. The hurricane soon weakened to a tropical storm and dissipated over San Luis Potosí late on August 16.

In Martinique, hundreds of homes were deroofed in Fort-de-France, while about 5,000 people were left homeless in the villages of Fond, Fourniols, La Haye, Recluce, and Tivoli, all of which were established after the eruption of Mount Pelée in 1902. The hurricane also left extensive damage to crops and eight fatalities. In Jamaica, several communities were completely or nearly destroyed, including Manchioneal, Port Antonio, and Port Maria. Thousands of homes also suffered damage in the capital city of Kingston. Banana crops were devastated so severely that many growers were forced into bankruptcy. Numerous ships were wrecked, particularly on the north coast of the island. There were at least 65 deaths and about $10 million in damage. At the Cayman Islands, more than 200 houses and seven of eight churches on Grand Cayman were destroyed or heavily damaged. Of the 23 ships in the harbor, only the Governor Blake survived. Most of the crews on board those ships were reported killed, but loss of life on shore was minimal. The storm also caused heavy damage on the Yucatán Peninsula. Many ships were wrecked and communications were cut off in several places. In the Tampico area, there was considerable damage to the port and many ships were sunk or driven ashore. Much of the land between Tampico and Cárdenas in San Luis Potosí was submerged due to flooding. In all, the storm is believed to have killed at least 149 people.

Hurricane Three 

Reanalysis indicates that a  tropical storm originated near Mayaguana in the Bahamas around 06:00 UTC on September 9, though lack of data suggests that this system likely developed earlier. Moving northwestward, the cyclone became a Category 1 hurricane around 12:00 UTC on the following day. Late on September 10 and early on September 11, the storm passed near Nassau. The hurricane then turned to the west-northwest on September 11 and moved just north of the Bimini Islands. Damage to crops and buildings occurred, but no deaths were reported over the island chain.

The Inchulva capsized near Delray Beach, drowning nine of her crew members. The cyclone caused severe wind damage in present-day Broward and Palm Beach counties, although most of the losses were to crops such as sugarcane. The hurricane weakened to a tropical storm while crossing Florida, but re-intensified into a hurricane over the Gulf of Mexico on September 12. In Northwest Florida, Alabama, and Georgia, the cyclone produced widespread rainfall, causing some crop damage. Additionally, a storm surge caused boats to be blown ashore in the Florida Panhandle. In all, the storm killed 14 people in Florida and produced $500,000 in damage. After falling to tropical storm intensity early on September 14, the storm weakened to a tropical depression on September 16, several hours before dissipating over South Carolina.

Hurricane Four 

The New Jersey Hurricane of 1903 or The Vagabond Hurricane

The storm moved relatively quickly to the northwest. Late on September 14, it strengthened into a Category 1 hurricane. On the following day, the storm began curving to the north-northwest. The storm weakened back to a Category 1 hurricane at 00:00 UTC on September 16. After moving inland, the system quickly weakened to a tropical storm late on September 16. The storm transitioned into an extratropical cyclone over New York near Lake Ontario at 12:00 UTC on September 17. The extratropical remnants soon dissipated over Ontario.

In North Carolina and Virginia, the storm brought nearly hurricane-force winds and rough surf. Some boats were beached along the coast of Virginia. Near Chincoteague, the schooner Beatrice capsized, drowning 28 people. Hundreds of birds were killed and fell to the ground near Old Point Comfort, many stripped of their feathers. The outer rainbands of the storm produced heavy rainfall near Washington, D.C., canceling a Major League Baseball game between the Detroit Tigers and the Washington Senators after the field was flooded. Along the Delaware coast, the schooner Hattie A. Marsh was smashed against the rocks, killing five people. The hurricane caused severe damage in New Jersey, especially in Atlantic City. Throughout the coastal regions, strong winds downed all telephone and telegraph wires. Additionally, the winds destroyed the roofs of an estimated 50 to 60 cottages. Several streets were flooded, with severe transportation delays reported. One indirect death occurred in Cape May when a man, unable to see owing to the hurricane, drove into a train. Damage in New Jersey was approximately $8 million. In New York City, high winds swayed buildings, spires, and bridges, overturning wagons on the Brooklyn Bridge. At least a few buildings were deroofed and many homes were flooded or damaged, especially in Brooklyn. One death occurred in the city. On Long Island, President Theodore Roosevelt directly experienced the effects of the hurricane while on a yacht. The life of the president was briefly threatened due to the rough conditions, though none on board of the yacht suffered any problems from the hurricane. Overall, the storm caused 57 fatalities.

Tropical Storm Five 

Historical weather maps indicated that a tropical depression developed just south of the Turks and Caicos Islands early on September 19. The depression trekked generally northward and remained weak for the next few days. By September 22, the system intensified into a tropical storm. Thereafter, it accelerated and slowly weakened, falling to tropical depression intensity early on September 26.

Hurricane Six 

Initially, the storm moved west-northwestward, but curved northwestward late the following day. At 00:00 UTC on September 28, the cyclone intensified into a Category 1 hurricane and then a Category 2 hurricane 12 hours later while curving to the northeast. The system then began to accelerate and weaken, falling to Category 1 intensity at 00:00 UTC on September 30. The remnants moved continued rapidly northeastward and dissipated later that day.

The winds uprooted a number of cedar trees and broke off large palmettos off palm trees. Several buildings and homes were damaged. A newly constructed extension on the Princess Hotel "collapsed like a pack of cards". In St. George's, a wall that collapsed near the Royal Engineers quarters killed a former soldier. Heavy rainfall on the island washed out many roads. A landslide occurred, shearing off a portion of the cliff at Deep Bay. The resulting earth trembling and noise created from the slide resembled an earthquake. Along the coast, rough seas wrecked a number of boats, while several stone docks and seawalls were severely damaged or destroyed. Another death occurred after an engineer on Ireland Island was swept out to sea and drowned.

Hurricane Seven 

Moving northwestward, it intensified into a Category 1 hurricane about 24 hours later. The storm then curved north-northeastward late on October 2. It then briefly turned east-northeastward, before recurving east-southeastward. Late on October 5, the hurricane weakened back to the Category 1. The storm began to decelerate and execute a cyclonic loop late on October 6. After about 24 hours, it began moving east-northeastward to northeastward. Early on October 9, the hurricane weakened to a tropical storm.

Tropical Storm Eight 

The storm nearly drifted northeastward while strengthening slowly over the next few days. Early on October 8, the cyclone curved north-northeastward.

Although the remnant system became indistinguishable by late on October 10, the remnants contributed to severe flooding along the East Coast of the United States. In North Carolina, poor weather conditions in Kitty Hawk prevented the Wright brothers from flying their glider or assembling the untested airplane. In Virginia, strong winds toppled trees and knocked out communications in cities such as Richmond and Norfolk, where a tree brought from Napoleon Bonaparte's grave in Paris, France, was uprooted. Wires were downed, completely disrupting communication. One death occurred inland when a man in Leesburg drowned while walking across a log on the Little River. Rough seas capsized nine vessels offshore Virginia, resulting in three deaths. Waves lashing the Back River Light caused the stones on its structure to move out of place.

The storm caused severe flooding states such as New Jersey, New York, and Pennsylvania. In Paterson, seven bridges were destroyed and two others were severely damaged. Approximately  of streets in the city were inundated. About 1,200 people fled their homes and took refuge at Paterson Armory. About 20% of land was inundated in both Passaic and Wallington. Damage in New Jersey reached about $7 million. Twenty deaths occurred, with two from drowning incidents, one from a heart attack, and seventeen others from a flood-related train crash near Trenton. Along the Delaware River, nine bridges connecting New Jersey and Pennsylvania were destroyed. In Pennsylvania, houses in Easton were swept into the river and destroyed after colliding with bridges. The Lehigh River overflowed into West Easton, damaging all businesses in the city. In New York, about  fell in New York City over a 48-hour period. Transportation by ferry, trolley, and railroad were also disrupted. A flooded conduit damaged 70 telegraph lines. In Poughkeepsie, two deaths occurred due to a landslide.

Tropical Storm Nine 

A westward moving disturbance was first noted between Barbados and Grenada on October 19 and later Hispaniola. By early October 21, the system developed into a tropical depression near Turks and Caicos Islands. The depression initially moved north-northwestward across the eastern Bahamas, remaining weak during its passage. After reaching the open Atlantic, the cyclone intensified into a tropical storm by 12:00 UTC on October 23. The remnants accelerated ahead of a cold front and later struck Newfoundland, before dissipating over the Labrador Sea on October 27.

Hurricane Ten 

The storm strengthened slowly and moved northwestward for the next few days, until curving northeastward late on November 19. At 06:00 UTC on the following day, the cyclone intensified into a Category 1 hurricane. Shortly thereafter, the hurricane turned eastward and then north-northeastward by November 22.

Season effects

This is a table of all of the storms that have formed in the 1903 Atlantic hurricane season. It includes their duration, names, landfall(s)–denoted by bold location names – damages, and death totals. Deaths in parentheses are additional and indirect (an example of an indirect death would be a traffic accident), but were still related to that storm. Damage and deaths include totals while the storm was extratropical, a wave, or a low, and all of the damage figures are in 1903 USD.

See also 

 List of tropical cyclones
 Atlantic hurricane season
 1900–09 Pacific hurricane seasons
 1900–1940 South Pacific cyclone seasons
 1900–1950 South-West Indian Ocean cyclone seasons
 1900s Australian region cyclone seasons

References

Printed Media 
 Terry Tucker. Beware the Hurricane! Hamilton Press: Bermuda, 1966.

External links 

 Monthly Weather Review

 
1903 meteorology
1903 natural disasters